The United States Air Force's 194th Wing is a special warfare, cyber and intelligence wing headquartered at Camp Murray, Washington. When the 194th Wing was activated on August 30, 2006, it was the Air National Guard's first non-flying Wing.

Units
The 194th Wing is composed of four groups, ten squadrons, and five flights. Most units are stationed at Camp Murray, two are located at Fairchild Air Force Base, and two are located at Joint Base Lewis-McChord.

 194th Air Support Operations Group
 111th Air Support Operations Squadron
 116th Air Support Operations Squadron
 116th Weather Flight
 The 194th Mission Support Group provides support to the wing through the following organizations:
 194th Force Support Squadron
 194th Logistics Readiness Squadron
 194th Communications Flight
 194th Security Forces Squadron
 194th Civil Engineering Flight
 248th Civil Engineering Flight
 194th Medical Group provides medical readiness training and other services.
 252d Cyberspace Operations Group: The 252d Cyberspace Operations Group includes cyberspace and military intelligence personnel.
  143d Cyberspace Operations Squadron: The 143d COS operates cyber protection teams.
  194th Intelligence Squadron: The 194th IS provides tailored target and geospatial intelligence to the air component and other federated partners to enable precision engagement and effective operations.
  242d Combat Communications Squadron: The 242 CBCS rapidly deploys, operates and maintains command, control, communications, and computer systems at any time and location around the globe.
  256th Intelligence Squadron: The 256th IS performs digital network intelligence analysis and provides intelligence, surveillance and reconnaissance support for defensive cyber operations.
 262d Cyberspace Operations Squadron: The 262d COS operates cyber protection teams.
 The 194th Comptroller Flight is assigned directly to the wing headquarters and provides financial management services to all wing organizations.

Lineage

 Established as the 194th Regional Support Wing and allotted to the Air National Guard
 Activated on 30 August 2006
 Redesignated 194th Wing c. 8 August 2015

Assignments
 Washington Air National Guard, 2006–present
 Gained by Air Combat Command, 2006-2015
 Gained by Air Force Space Command, 2015-2018
 Gained by Air Combat Command, 2018-present

Components
 194th Air Support Operations Group, 30 August 2006 – present
 194th Mission Support Group, 30 August 2006 – present
 194th Medical Group, 30 August 2006 – present
 252d Cyberspace Operations Group, 30 August 2006 – present

Commanders
 Col. John S. Tuohy, 2006-2008
 Col. Brian T. Dravis, 2008-2013
 Col. Jill Lannan, 2013-2015
 Col. Jeremy Horn, 2015-2017
 Col. Gent Welsh, 2017-2019
 Col. Kenneth Borchers, 2019-present

Awards and Campaigns

References

Notes
 Explanatory notes

 Citations

Bibliography

External links
 
 
 262nd Network Warfare Squadron 
http://www.194wg.ang.af.mil
http://www.facebook.com/194wg

Wings of the United States Air National Guard
Military units and formations in Washington (state)